Agave parrasana, the cabbage head agave or cabbage head century plant, is a flowering plant in the family Asparagaceae. A slow-growing evergreen succulent from North East Mexico, it produces a compact rosette of fleshy thorn-tipped grey-green leaves, 60 cm tall and wide. The leaves are blue green and the thorns are red. The whole plant may reach 100 centimeters tall and wide. Occasionally mature plants produce a spectacular flower head up to 6m tall, opening red and turning yellow. This signals the death of the flowering rosette, however offsets may form and continue growing.

In the US, it may be grown outdoors in USDA hardiness zones 7–10. It is susceptible to scale and chlorosis resulting from magnesium deficiency.

References

parrasana
Taxa named by Alwin Berger